Lin is a village in the former Udënisht Municipality in Korçë County, Albania. At the 2015 local government reform it became part of the municipality Pogradec.

Geography

Lin is situated on a small peninsula on Lake Ohrid, just south of the Qafë Thanë mountain pass, which is a border-crossing point between Albania and North Macedonia. Pogradec is roughly 22 km to the south of the village, while Struga is about 10 km north, along the lake shore. Radožda is the nearest settlement on the opposite side of the border.

History
The Lin area has been inhabited since at least the Iron Age. Archaeological findings from the hilltop above the present-day village include foundation walls and mosaics of an early Christian Byzantine church, dating from the 6th century. The church is a Cultural Monument of Albania and is included within the possible UNESCO site of the Natural and Cultural Heritage of the Ohrid Region (Albania).

In 1873, the village was recorded as having 65 households with 90 male Bulgarian Orthodox Christians and 62 male Muslims. In 1900, Vasil Kanchov traveled throughout the region, and he would report that Lin was a mixed village split equally between 300 Bulgarian Christians and 300 Albanian Muslims

Demographics 
The Albanian Tosk dialect is spoken in the area. Lin is the only place in Albania where the Vevčani-Radožda dialect of Macedonian is spoken by Macedonians. The other three villages in which this dialect is spoken are in North Macedonia.

During the 2000s linguists Klaus Steinke and Xhelal Ylli seeking to corroborate villages cited in past literature as being Slavic speaking carried out fieldwork. Lin was noted as being a mixed village of Orthodox Christians and Muslims having 1680 inhabitants and 296 families. Local Lin villagers stated that few families still speak Macedonian, such as in instances of marriage with women from neighbouring Radožda in North Macedonia, however, Macedonian overall is not used by the third generation.

Photos

References

 
Populated places in Pogradec
Villages in Korçë County
Albanian Ohrid Lake Coast